The Crash Aniversario (Spanish for "The Crash Anniversary") is an annually recurring professional wrestling supercard event, scripted and produced by the Mexican lucha libre wrestling company The Crash Lucha Libre to commemorate the company holding their first show on November 4, 2011. The Crash has always held their Aniversario Shows in Auditorio Fausto Gutierrez in Tijuana, Baja California, Mexico where the first and the most The Crash shows are held.

The Crash promoted shows on a limited schedule from 2011 through 2015 and did not promote any shows in November to mark their anniversary. The company increased their show schedule in 2016 and held their first officially billed anniversary show on November 26, 2016, The Crash V Aniversario.

The most recent Aniversario show held by The Crash was The Crash VIII Aniversario show, held on November 1, 2019. Over the years the Aniversario shows have hosted three Lucha de Apuestas, or "bet matches" matches; Bestia 666 defeating Jack Evans in 2017, and Garza Jr. in 2018, in both instances the losers were shaved bald. In 2019 Triple Amenaza (Star Boy, Viento, and Zarco) defeated Los Haraganes (Animal, Demencia, and Silver Star) forcing all three Haraganes to unmask.

The Crash Women's Championship was introduced as part of The Crash V Aniversario show in 2016, and the first The Crash Heavyweight Championship holder was crowned as part of The Crash VII Aniversario show. The Crash anniversaries have also featured championship matches for the remained of The Crash's championships; The Crash Junior Championship, The Crash Cruiserweight Championship, and The Crash Tag Team Championship.

The Crash debut show

Dates, venues, and main events

References

The Crash Lucha Libre shows
Annual events in Mexico
Recurring events established in 2012
Professional wrestling anniversary shows